The following outline is provided as an overview of and topical guide to Venus:

Venus – second planet from the Sun, orbiting it every 224.7 Earth days. It has the longest rotation period (243 days) of any planet in the Solar System and rotates in the opposite direction to most other planets. It has no natural satellite. It is named after the Roman goddess of love and beauty. It is the second-brightest natural object in the night sky after the Moon, reaching an apparent magnitude of −4.6, bright enough to cast shadows. Because Venus orbits within Earth's orbit it is an inferior planet. Venus is a terrestrial planet and is sometimes called Earth's "sister planet" because of their similar size, mass, proximity to the Sun, and bulk composition. It is radically different from Earth in other respects. It has the densest atmosphere of the four terrestrial planets, consisting of more than 96% carbon dioxide. The atmospheric pressure at the planet's surface is 92 times that of Earth, or roughly the pressure found  underwater on Earth.

Classification of Venus 

 Astronomical object
 Gravitationally rounded object
 Planet
 Planet of the Solar System
 Inferior planet
 Inner planet
 Terrestrial planet

Location of Venus 

 Milky Way Galaxy – barred spiral galaxy
 Orion Arm – a spiral arm of the Milky Way
 Solar System – the Sun and the objects that orbit it, including 8 planets, the planet second-closest to the Sun being Venus
 Orbit of Venus

Features of Venus 

 Atmosphere of Venus
 Geology of Venus
 Geological features on Venus
 Arachnoid
 Coronae on Venus
 Craters on Venus
 Montes on Venus
 Terrae on Venus
 Volcanism on Venus
 Orbit of Venus
 Quadrangles on Venus

History of Venus 

History of Venus

Exploration of Venus 

 Observations and explorations of Venus
 Artificial objects on Venus

Flybys and direct missions to explore Venus 

 Venera
 Venera 1
 Venera 2
 Venera 3
 Venera 4
 Venera 5
 Venera 6
 Venera 7
 Venera 8
 Venera 9
 Venera 10
 Venera 11
 Venera 12
 Venera 13
 Venera 14
 Venera 15
 Venera 16
 Mariner program
 Mariner 2
 Mariner 5
 Mariner 10
 Zond program
 Zond 1
 Pioneer Venus project
 Vega program
 Vega 1
 Vega 2
 Galileo spacecraft
 Magellan spacecraft
 Cassini–Huygens
 Venus Express
 MESSENGER
 Akatsuki spacecraft
 IKAROS
 Shin'en

Cancelled missions to explore Venus 

 TMK
 Manned Venus Flyby

Future of Venus exploration 

 Colonization of Venus
 Terraforming of Venus

Proposed missions to explore Venus 

 Venera-D
 Venus In-Situ Explorer
 Venus Entry Probe
 Shukrayaan-1

Venus in popular culture 

 Venus in fiction
 Venusians

See also 

 Outline of astronomy
 Outline of the Solar System
 Outline of space exploration

 Ashen light
 Cytherean
 Hesperus
 Neith

References

External links 

 Venus profile at NASA's Solar System Exploration site
 Missions to Venus and Image catalog at the National Space Science Data Center
 Soviet Exploration of Venus and Image catalog at Mentallandscape.com
 Venus page at The Nine Planets
 Transits of Venus at NASA.gov
 Geody Venus, a search engine for surface features

 Cartographic resources
 Map-a-Planet: Venus by the U.S. Geological Survey
 Gazetteer of Planetary Nomenclature: Venus by the International Astronomical Union
 Venus crater database by the Lunar and Planetary Institute
 Map of Venus by Eötvös Loránd University

Venus
Venus